Pallichal is a village in Thiruvananthapuram district in the state of Kerala, India. Pallichal is the village which get first fully e-literate panchayat in the Kerala state. Pallichal revenue viilage comes under the Neyyattinkara (tehsil) taluk.

Demographics
 India census, Pallichal had a population of 52562 with 25994 males and 26568 females.

References

Villages in Thiruvananthapuram district